Vuit is a Catalan pop rock band, formed in 2009. The integrants of the group are Carlos Martínez, Òscar Villoria and Llorenç Anguer.

Trajectory 

Vuit was born in 2009 by Carlos (singer and guitarist) and Ramon Hernández Moscoso (partner, electric guitarist and producer of the first disk of the band). But it wasn't until later when Òscar (drummer) and Llorenç (bass and chorus) entered to the group. Finally the group ended to be with three members: Carlos, Òscar and Llorenç. All of them, get record on 2009 its first model of the songs that later will be its first studio disk “Un dia qualsevol” (Any Other Day); a name that certainly, the same band explain it as follows: “...we started –the project– like any other day , for this reason we called this name at the disk. It was the day that we stayed in my home composing the first song of the disk, Julia. We uploaded Princesa at Myspace and Picap -discography– and it contact with our and like this it started the adventure.

The Catalan band has hot and sad, committed, emotive songs, that them are the adjectives that characterize the band. The best of pop-rock with small thinks of alternative rock and the Vuit innovative style seems for moments The Fray, OneRepublic, Keane,—occupying an until unknown panorama in the Catalan music world.

The name of the group (“Vuit”) usually wakes up the curiosity of the media, and the answer of this question is always the same “we met hardly all days at 8 o’clock to test, in fact, we did everything at 8 o’clock, and we decided to call us this”, Òscar in “Matins de TV3”. “...and Carlos said we will call VUIT, we look us and we knew that it was the perfect name, we felt identificate with it and we liked the strong of this name.”, interview in Adolescents.

Vuit has welcomed since they show to the public their first “cada cop”, it is available in the most important buying online music portals (iTunes, Spotify,...). Vuit has achieved a prominence in the social networks and is qualified for some medias in like “the teenager young band of catalan pop-rock”, although it isn't the most important like they said in different times the components of the band. Concretely, the number of subscriptions at Facebook or Twitter is more than 100.000 members. However, this success has to be accompanied of the each member trajectory. In fact, Llorenç, before that he incorporates into the group, he was playing the bass in a melodic hardcore, like Carlos and Òscar that they also had together and in parallel their group of heavy music.  A change that is really impressive but it have had a very well achieved for the public.

In 2011, Vuit take out their second album 15 dies i una nit (15 days and a night) which they consolidate their trajectory. For understand it, it's enough that look at the collaborations of the disk: Manu Guix, Mikel Iglesias and Nil Cardoner. Manu Guix is unveiled like a sing teacher in the “Operación Triumfo” academy, but in the last years has been in solitary, this like his collaboration for a lot of Catalan groups, like the production of this disk. Mikel Iglesias and Nil Cardoner are actors of the TV3 series called Polseres Vermelles that has achieved the especial interest of Steven Spielberg and Marta Kauffman, co-creator of the mythical series Friends. Polseres Vermelles has propulsated at the success Teràpia de Shock and "els Vuit" and it has been bought for the American channel ABC that it thinks to do an arrangement that will be called “The red band society” and it will be on TV for the rest of Spain by Antena 3 (without count a possible second emission of new chapters and it will be amited at the same time by TV3). Polseres Vermelles is about a group of boys and girls that they match in a hospital because they have illnesses. Without they exit of their especial circumstances that they are, the story about this six boys and teenagers shows as the anecdotes and situations of this boys and girls of the same age, but with the difference that their world is a hospital.

Their second single, “Dorm”, has the collaboration of Nil Cardoner and Mikel Iglesias and it has been nominated like other successful groups “Els Catarres”, “Obrint pas” or “Amelie” at the best “Videoclip of the Year” in the Enderrock Awards  Enderrock Awards 2012. In fact, the presence of Mikel Iglesias has started to be usual in their concerts, that every day are more numerous. Vuit has actuated in mythical concerts rooms like Luz de Gas or at Palau Sant Jordi, place that other famous musical artists has seduced the Catalan (Lady Gaga, Shakira, Madonna, Bruce Springsteen,....

Finally, noteworthy the significant change of discography. ”Blanco y Negro” has been the discographic mark under "els Vuit" have wanted to produce this second album. “Blanco y Negro” is in charge of the Europa FM hits,... or the production and the promotion of international groups like Sak Noel with “Loca People”, Pitbull, Bob Sinclar,...

Discography 

“Un dia qualsevol"(Any Other Day)

1. Cada cop
2. Tornarem
3. Júlia
4. Princesa
5. Crida
6. El teu moment
7. Sempre al teu costat
8. Ara
9. L'univers
10. Tu tens

“15 dies i una nit”(15 days and a night)

1. Dorm
2. Fuig
3. Què vols de mi?
4. Com un nen petit
5. Un dia més
6. Qui són
7. Per un instant
8. Les nits
9. Parla'm del vent
10. Per tu
11. Tan ràpid
12. Sempre igual
13. Dorm (with Mikel Iglesias and Nil Cardoner, actors of"Polseres Vermelles" of TV3)
14. Com un nen petit (with Manu Guix, exteacher of Operación Triunfo academy)

"Recorda que..."

1. La nostra funció
2. Un camí per tornar
3. Afaga'm la mà
4. Aigua
5. Barbie de ciutat
6. Increïbles
7. Respira
8. He après
9. Una resposta
10. Ja fa anys
11. Somiaré
12. Sóc com sóc

Singles 

“Un dia qualsevol”(Any Other Day)
Cada cop
Júlia
Princesa
Crida
Tu tens (Polseres Vermelles’ podcast)
Tornarem (Polseres Vermelles’ podcast)

“15 dies i una nit”(15 days and a night)
Què vols de mi?
Dorm
Com un nen petit
Ven (song in Spanish of "Dorm")

'''"Recorda que..."
Un camí per tornar

References

External links 
 Web Site Official
  MySpace of Vuit
 https://web.archive.org/web/20120505224712/http://blancoynegro.com/releases/8421597066309.html
 http://www.picap.com/ct/rss:Cos/totesnoticies/_/561
 http://www.enderrock.cat/disc/803/dies/nit

Musical groups from Catalonia
Musical groups established in 2009
Spanish pop rock music groups